Strømmen Station is a railway station on the Trunk Line in Skedsmo, Norway. It is served by the Oslo Commuter Rail line L1 operated by Vy running from Lillestrøm via Oslo S to Spikkestad. The station was opened in 1854 along with the rest of the Trunk Line.

The station is located beside the former railway factory Strømmens Værksted.

External links
Jernbaneverket's entry on Strømmen station

Railway stations in Skedsmo
Railway stations on the Trunk Line
Railway stations opened in 1854
1854 establishments in Norway
Heinrich Wenck buildings
Art Nouveau architecture in Norway
Art Nouveau railway stations